Räni is a small borough in Kambja Parish, Tartu County in southern Estonia, it is located on the southwestern side of the city of Tartu. It has a population of 466 (as of 1 September 2010).

References

Boroughs and small boroughs in Estonia